Adrianna Górna (born 22 March 1996) is a Polish handballer for Metraco Zagłębie Lubin and the Polish national team.

International honours 
Carpathian Trophy:
Winner: 2017

References

External links

1996 births
Living people
People from Kwidzyn
Polish female handball players
21st-century Polish women